Yörükler is a neighborhood of Geyve district of Sakarya province.

Population

References 

Villages in Sakarya Province